Delias kenricki is a butterfly in the family Pieridae. It was described by George Talbot in 1937. It is found in New Guinea (Arfak Mountains). The name honours George Hamilton Kenrick.

References

External links
Delias at Markku Savela's Lepidoptera and Some Other Life Forms

kenricki
Butterflies described in 1937